The County of Livingstone is a county (a cadastral division) in Queensland, Australia. It is centred on the city of Rockhampton and includes most of the Rockhampton Region. The county was created on 1 September 1855 by royal proclamation under the Waste Lands Australia Act 1846. On 7 March 1901, the Governor issued a proclamation legally dividing Queensland into counties under the Land Act 1897. Its schedule described Livingstone thus:

Parishes 
Livingstone is divided into parishes, as listed below:

References

Livingstone

External links